Mohibullah Samim (born 1965) was appointed as the Governor of Paktika on 20 April 2010.  He was born in the Waghaz district of southern Ghazni province.Publisher in Kabul,
Zurmat Material Testing Laboratory
Director Information and Culture in Ghazni Province,
District Chief in two Districts of Ghaznis Province,
Provincial Governor Paktika (20100421, 20130119-20141219)
Minister of border and tribal affaires nominated and acting (20200831) confirmed (20201201)
Samin has a bachelor's degree in linguistics and has served as a publisher of a private magazine in Kabul. He previously served as the director of information and culture in Ghazni province, and as a sub-governor in two districts of Ghazni province. He is an ethnic Pashtun. In a message to the Taliban he said: "To the Taliban I say, come to the government and talk. Let's make it better for all of us. I will try to respect everyone. I will try to bring unity to all tribes. I will be working for unity on behalf of all people of Paktika province and my door is open 24 hours a day if you need me."

References

Pashtun people
People from Ghazni Province
Living people
1965 births